Saleumxay Kommasith (born 31 October 1968) is a Laotian politician who has been Minister of Foreign Affairs of Laos since April 2016.  He is one of 13 members of 11th Politburo of the Lao People's Revolutionary Party.

He was reelected as Minister of Foreign Affairs for second term at the 9th National Assembly in March 2021.

Life and career 

Saleumxay was born in Houaphan Province, Laos. He gained his MA in International Relations at the Moscow State University of International Relations in Moscow, Russia from 1986 to 1992. He continued his education in Monash University, Australia for another MA in International Study and Development from 1996 to 1997. In addition to Lao, he also speaks Russian, French and English.

Throughout his years in the government, he has an extensive list of appointments. He was Director General of the Department of International Organizations at the Ministry of Foreign Affairs from 2007 to 2011. From 2011 to 2012, he was Assistant Minister of Foreign Affairs. From 2012 to 2013, he served as Permanent Representative of Laos to the United Nations. He was Vice Minister of Foreign Affairs from 2014 to 2016. He was elected as Minister of Foreign Affairs in April 2016. In March 2021, he was reelected as Minister of Foreign Affairs for second term by the 9th National Assemble of the Lao PDR.

See also 
List of foreign ministers in 2017
List of current foreign ministers

References

External links 
 Ministry of Foreign Affairs of Laos

1968 births
Living people
Members of the 10th Central Committee of the Lao People's Revolutionary Party
Members of the 11th Central Committee of the Lao People's Revolutionary Party
Members of the 11th Politburo of the Lao People's Revolutionary Party
Deputy Prime Ministers of Laos
Foreign ministers of Laos
Government ministers of Laos
Lao People's Revolutionary Party politicians